The periscleral lymph space or episcleral space of the eye is the space between the outer surface of the sclera and the inner surface of the capsule of Tenon. It is continuous with the subdural and subarachnoid spaces, and is traversed by fine bands of connective tissue.

References

 Bartleby.com Tunics of the Eye.

Periscleral lymph space